Andorra–La Seu d'Urgell Airport is a public airport owned by the government of Catalonia and hosts general aviation and  commercial flights. It is located in the municipality of Montferrer i Castellbò in Catalonia, eastern Spain, and serves the city of la Seu d'Urgell and the microstate of Andorra, which is 12 km north of the airport. The airport has a short runway which limits aircraft sizes and the distance to destinations.

History
La Seu d'Urgell airfield opened in 1982 but was closed to commercial traffic in 1984 and was used only by private aircraft until 2008, when the airport was purchased by the Catalan government and closed pending its redevelopment and reopening as a commercial airport. In 2008, the Institut Català del Sòl (a department of the Catalan government) bought 85% of the airport's land to create Pirineus–La Seu d'Urgell Airport. In 2009, a contract was awarded to Acsa Sorigué for the redevelopment work towards reopening the airport.

The airport reopened on 4 June 2010. In the first year there was a total of 1,751 flights, with more than 3,000 people on board. An agreement between the Catalan government and the Principality of Andorra, located 12 km away, was reached in 2014 to rename the facility Andorra–La Seu d'Urgell Airport following financial investment from Andorra.

On 8 January 2015, the airport opened as a public airport, and started receiving regular or tourist charter flights during 2015. Eight tourist charter flights per direction were operated by Swiftair during the summer 2015, four from Madrid, four from Palma de Mallorca. 2015 also saw the arrival of Air Andorra and Andorra Airlines, with both airlines using the airport as its main hub and offering flights to various airports in Spain and France. French regional airline Twin Jet operated flights to the airport during March 2018, with routes from Madrid, Marseille and Palma de Mallorca.

Airlines and destinations
The following airlines operate regular scheduled and charter flights at Andorra–La Seu d'Urgell Airport:

References

External links
Andorra–La Seu d'Urgell Airport

Airports in Catalonia
Aviation in Andorra
La Seu d'Urgell
Airports established in 1982
1982 establishments in Spain